The Endangered Archives Programme (EAP) is a funding programme and digital archive run by the British Library in London. It has the purpose of preserving cultural heritage where resources may be limited. Each year EAP awards grants to researchers to identify and preserve culturally important archives by digitising them in situ. The original archival material does not leave the country of origin, and projects often incorporate local training and career development. EAP focuses on material created before the mid twentieth century.

Related programmes also sponsored by Arcadia include the Endangered Languages Documentation Project at the Berlin-Brandenburg Academy, the Endangered Knowledge Documentation Programme at the British Museum, the Modern Endangered Archives Program at University of California, Los Angeles, and the Endangered Wooden Architecture Programme at Oxford Brookes University.

Projects 
As of 2019 EAP had funded over 400 projects. Some of these have received media coverage, including projects on manuscripts containing magical texts from Djenne, Mali, and the Islamic libraries of Timbuktu, Mali, which are under threat of destruction by war, collections of palm-leaf manuscripts from Sri Lanka, and archives from Brazil.

Digital collections 
The digital collections of the Endangered Archives Programme comprise over 7 million images and 25,000 sound files. The digital material includes manuscripts, printed books, archival documents, photographs, and early sound recordings. The original material and digital files remain in the country of origin, copies being made available to researchers on the EAP website. EAP collections come from Africa, Asia, the Americas and the Caribbean, Russia and Eastern Europe.

History 
Since 2004, the Endangered Archives Programme has been administered by the British Library with the financial support of the Arcadia Fund. The Programme was initially based within the Asia, Pacific and Africa Collections (APAC) of the British Library and had two full-time members of staff, with the directorship being the responsibility of the head of APAC. In 2011, EAP moved to the newly formed Digital Scholarship section of the British Library. Previous directors include Graham Shaw, Susan Whitfield, Aly Conteh and Adam Farquhar. In 2018, a second phase of the Programme began with a further grant from Arcadia when EAP moved to the Collections and Curation department of the British Library. Sam van Schaik was appointed the first head of EAP in February 2019.

Similar projects 
 Unlocking Our Sound Heritage – UK project for digitising project for audio archival material
 Unlocking Film Heritage – UK project for digitising audiovisual archival material
 Theatre Archive Project – for British theatre history
 Qatar Digital Library

Citations

References 
The following is a list of academic articles based on EAP projects and digital collections:

 Bazarov, A (2018) "The Buddhist Book Culture of the Average Person and Buryat Identity" in Sibirica, Volume 18
 Biagetti, S., Kaci, A., Mori, L., & di Lernia, S. (2012) "Writing the desert: the ‘Tifinagh’ rock inscriptions of the Tadrart Acacus (southwestern Libya)" in Azania: Archaeological Research in Africa, Vol 47, 2012, Issue 2
 Butler M and Bliss D.A (2018) "Digital Resources: The Hijuelas Collection" in Latin American History, Oxford Research Encyclopedias DOI:10.1093/acrefore/9780199366439.013.618.
 Fathurahman, O. (2018) "Female Indonesian Sufis: Shattariyah Murids in the 18th and 19th Centuries in Java" in Kyoto Bulletin of Islamic Area Studies, Kyoto University, Issue 11
 Hijjas, M. (2017) "Marks of many hands: Annotation in the Malay manuscript tradition and a Sufi compendium from West Sumatra" in Indonesia and the Malay World, Vol 45, 2017, Issue 132
 Jerkov, A and Milnovic V (2018), “Using Innovative Technologies in Preservation and Presentation of Endangered Archives” Lecture Notes in Computer Science (LNCS), Revised Selected Papers, Springer-Nature Verlag, Vol. 10605.
 Mishra, S. and Raj Y (2017) "Gayalal Papers, 1940–1969 v.s.: Life at a Low Rung in XIX Century Military Bureaucracy" in Studies in Nepali History and Society, Vol 22, Number 2 (ISSN: 1025-5109) pp 399-470
 Ngom, F. (2017) "West African Manuscripts in Arabic and African Languages and Digital Preservation" in African History, Oxford Research Encyclopedias
 Ngom, F. and Castro, C. (2019) "Beyond African orality: Digital preservation of Mandinka ʿAjamī archives of Casamance" in History Compass 17.8.
 Ngom, F. and Castro, C. (2019) "Beyond African orality: Digital preservation of Mandinka ʿAjamī archives of Casamance" in History Compass 
 Peacock, A.C.S. (2019) "Arabic Manuscripts from Buton, Southeast Sulawesi, and the Literary Activities of Sultan Muḥammad ʿAydarūs (1824–1851)" in Journal of Islamic Manuscripts, Volume 10: Issue 1, pp 44-83 Brill
 Philips, J. (2014). "The Early Issues of the First Newspaper in Hausa Gaskiya ta fi Kwabo, 1939–1945" History in Africa, 41, 425-431.
 Qobo, CKM (2010), “Challenges of Digitizing the Endangered Lesotho Royal Archives.” ESARBICA Journal 29.
 Robinson, G (2014), “Break the rules, save the records: human rights archives and the search for justice in East Timor.” Archival Science 14.3-4.
 Silva, S (2018), “Endangered Archives Programme: experiências arquivísticas e a digitalização de documentos históricos na Paraíba” Revista Accesso Livre No. 9.
 Suliman, R (2019), “Renewal of the 14-year journey of the endangered archives programme.” Alexandria: The Journal of National and International Library and Information Issues 1.11.
 Thapa, S (2015), “Endangered Archives Programme and Digitisation of EAP-676: Manuscripts in Nepal”, Abhilekha, No. 33 (2072 VS).
 Zeitlin, D (2008), “Archiving a Cameroonian Photographic Studio With the Help of the British Library Endangered Archives Programme.” African Research and Documentation 107.

External links
 Endangered Archives Programme
 Modern Endangered Archives Programme
 Endangered Languages Documentation Programme
 Endangered Knowledge Documentation Programme

Archives in the London Borough of Camden
British Library
Online archives of the United Kingdom